SQL Return Codes are used on a day-to-day basis for the diagnosis of programming failures as a result of SQL calls by IBM Db2 programs. An important feature of IBM Db2 programs is the error processing. The error diagnostic containing the SQL Return Code is held in the field SQLCODE within the Db2 SQLCA block.

SQLCODE is no longer part of the SQL-standard. The SQL-standard replaced SQLCODE by the more detailed SQLSTATE.

SQLCA 
The SQL communications area (SQLCA) structure is used within the IBM Db2 program to return feedback to the application program.

SQLCODE 
The SQLCODE field contains the SQL return code. The code can be zero (0), negative or positive:
 0 means that the execution was successful.
 Negative values indicate an unsuccessful execution with an error.An example is -911, which means that a timeout has occurred with a rollback.
 Positive value mean a successful execution with a warning.An example is +100, which means that no matching rows were found or that the cursor has reached the end of the table.

Here is a more comprehensive list of the SQLCODEs for DB2. Note that this list is not exhaustive. Also note that some SQLCODEs may only occur in specific Db2 products; e.g., only on Db2 z/OS, only on Db2 LUW, or only on Db2 for IBM i.

Zero (Successful) 
   0    Successful

Negative values (Errors)

Positive Values (Warnings)

References 

Articles copied to Wikibooks in need of cleanup
IBM DB2